Lower Lakes Towing is a Canadian shipping firm, operating on North American Great Lakes.

Her fleet includes 
the Robert S. Pierson,
the Cuyahoga,
the Kaministqua,
the Manitoulin,
the Michipicoten,
the Ojibway,
the Saginaw  and 
the Tecumseh.

Since 2006, the company has been wholly owned by Rand Logistics along with Grand River Navigation Company.

References 

Shipping companies of Canada
Great Lakes
Great Lakes Shipping Companies